Dantes may refer to:

Dante's, a nightclub in Portland, Oregon, United States
The United States Armed Forces' Defense Activity for Non-Traditional Education Support program
The Dantes, an American garage rock band

People with the surname
Dingdong Dantes (born 1980), Filipino actor
Roland Dantes (1940–2009), Filipino actor, bodybuilder and martial artist
Tony Dantes (born 1930), Filipino actor
Stephen Dantes, Saint Lucian writer

People with the given name
Dantes Diwiak, German opera singer
Dantes Tsitsi (born 1959), Nauruan politician

Fictional characters
Edmond Dantès, a title character and the protagonist of Alexandre Dumas, père's 1844 adventure novel The Count of Monte Cristo